Viola odorata is a species of flowering plant in the genus Viola, native to Europe and Asia. This small hardy herbaceous perennial is commonly known as wood violet, sweet violet, English violet, common violet, florist's violet, or garden violet. It has been introduced into North America and Australia.

Characteristics
Viola odorata can be distinguished by the following characteristics:
the flowers are scented
the flowers are normally either dark violet or white
the leaves and flowers are all in a basal rosette
the style is hooked (and does not end with a rounded appendage)
the leaf-stalks have hairs which point downwards
the plant spreads with stolons (above-ground shoots)

The species can be found near the edges of forests or in clearings; it is also a common "uninvited guest" in shaded lawns or elsewhere in gardens.

Uses
Several cultivars have been selected for garden use, of which V. odorata 'Wellsiana' has gained the Royal Horticultural Society's Award of Garden Merit.

The sweet scent of this flower has proved popular, particularly in the late Victorian period, and has consequently been used in the production of many cosmetic fragrances and perfumes. The French are also known for their violet syrup, most commonly made from an extract of violets. In the United States, this French violet syrup is used to make violet scones and marshmallows.
The scent of violet flowers is distinctive with only a few other flowers having a remotely similar odor.  References to violets and the desirable nature of the fragrance go back to classical sources such as Pliny and Horace when the name ‘Ion’ was in use to describe this flower from which the name of the distinctive chemical constituents of the flower, the ionones – is derived. In 1923, Poucher wrote that the flowers were widely cultivated both in Europe and the East for their fragrance, with both the flowers and leaves being separately collected and extracted for fragrance, and flowers also collected for use in confectionery galenical syrup  and in the production of medicine.

There is some doubt as to whether the true extract of the violet flower is still used commercially in perfumes. It certainly was in the early 20th century, but by the time Steffen Arctander was writing in the late 1950s and early 1960s, production had "almost disappeared". Violet leaf absolute, however, remains widely used in modern perfumery.

The leaves are edible. Real violet flower extract is available for culinary uses, especially in European countries, but it is expensive.

Herbal medicine
In herbal medicine, V. odorata has been used for a variety of respiratory ailments, insomnia, and skin disorders.  However, there is insufficient evidence to support its effectiveness for these uses.

In mythology
The violet flower was a favorite in ancient Greece and became the symbol of Athens. Scent suggested sex, so the violet was an emblematic flower of Aphrodite and also of her son Priapus, the deity of gardens and generation.

Iamus was a son of Apollo and the nymph Evadne. He was abandoned by his mother at birth. She left him lying in the Arkadian wilds on a bed of violets where he was fed honey by serpents. Eventually, he was discovered by passing shepherds who named him Iamus after the violet (ion) bed.

The goddess Persephone and her companion Nymphs were gathering rose, crocus, violet, iris, lily and larkspur blooms in a springtime meadow when she was abducted by the god Hades.

In culture
V. odorata may be the species mentioned in Shakespeare's famous lines:
"I know a bank where the wild thyme blows,
Where oxlips and the nodding violet grows,
Quite over-canopied with luscious woodbine,
With sweet musk-roses and with eglantine"

Gallery

References

External links

The American Violet Society

odorata
Flora of Asia
Flora of Europe
Flora of the United Kingdom
Medicinal plants
Flora of New Jersey
Flora of Lebanon
Plants described in 1753
Taxa named by Carl Linnaeus